is the debut solo single by Mayu Watanabe, released in Japan on February 29, 2012.

Background 
The single was released in four versions: Limited Edition A, Limited Edition B, Limited Edition C, and Regular Edition.

Track listing

Regular Edition

Limited Edition A

Limited Edition B

Limited Edition C

Charts

References

External links 
 Mayu Watanabe's discography
 

2012 singles
Songs with lyrics by Yasushi Akimoto
Mayu Watanabe songs
Sony Music Entertainment Japan singles
2012 songs